Backpfeifengesicht may refer to:
"Backpfeifengesicht", a song by Die Ärtze from the album Bäst of
"Backpfeifengesicht", a song by Animals as Leaders from the album The Madness of Many